Brother Bear is a 2003 American animated musical fantasy comedy-drama film produced by Walt Disney Feature Animation and released by Walt Disney Pictures. The 44th Disney animated feature film, it was directed by Aaron Blaise and Robert Walker (in their feature directorial debuts) and produced by Chuck Williams, from a screenplay written by Tab Murphy, Lorne Cameron, David Hoselton, and the writing team of Steve Bencich and Ron J. Friedman. The film stars the voices of Joaquin Phoenix, Jeremy Suarez, Rick Moranis, Dave Thomas, Jason Raize (in his only film role), and D.B. Sweeney. Brother Bear follows an Alaska native boy named Kenai as he pursues a bear and kills it, but the Spirits, incensed by this unnecessary death, change Kenai into a bear himself as punishment. In order to be human again, Kenai must travel to a mountain where the Northern lights touch the earth. 

The film was the third and final Disney animated feature produced primarily by the Feature Animation studio at Disney-MGM Studios in Orlando, Florida; the studio was shut down in March 2004, not long after the release of this film in favor of computer animated features. The film, which was released in the United States on November 1, 2003, received mixed reviews from critics and received a nomination for Best Animated Feature at the 76th Academy Awards, losing to Pixar's Finding Nemo. The film grossed $250 million against a $46 million budget. A direct-to-video sequel, Brother Bear 2, was released on August 29, 2006.

Plot
In a post-ice age Alaska, the local tribes believe all creatures are created through the Great Spirits, who are said to appear in the form of an aurora. A trio of brothers, Kenai, the youngest; Denahi, the middle; and Sitka, the eldest, return to their tribe in order for Kenai to receive his totem, necklaces in the shapes of different animals. The particular animals they represent symbolize what they must achieve to call themselves men. Unlike Sitka, who gained the eagle of guidance, and Denahi, who gained the wolf of wisdom, Kenai receives the bear of love. He objects to his totem, stating that bears are thieves, and believes his point is made a fact when a brown bear steals their basket of salmon. Kenai and his brothers pursue the bear, but a fight ends on top of a glacier, during which Sitka gives his life to save his brothers by dislodging the glacier, although the bear survives the fall. After Sitka's funeral, an enraged Kenai blames the bear for Sitka's death. He hunts down and chases the bear up onto a rocky cliff, fighting and eventually slaying it. The Spirits, represented by Sitka's spirit in the form of a bald eagle, arrive and transform Kenai into a bear after the dead bear's body evaporates and joins them. Denahi arrives and, falsely believing that Kenai was killed by the bear from earlier, vows to avenge Kenai by hunting it down.

Kenai falls down some rapids, survives, and is healed by Tanana, the shaman of his tribe. She does not speak the bear language, but advises him to return to the mountain to find Sitka and be turned back to a human, but only when he atones for his actions; she vanishes without an explanation. Kenai quickly discovers that the wildlife can now speak to him, meeting a pair of moose brothers named Rutt and Tuke. He gets caught in a trap, but is freed by an outgoing bear cub named Koda. They make a deal: Kenai will escort Koda to an annual salmon run and then the cub will lead Kenai to the mountain. Along the way the two eventually form a brother-like relationship. While riding on the backs of a mammoth herd, Koda reveals that his mother is missing. The two are hunted by Denahi, who is still determined to avenge Kenai, unaware that the bear he is pursuing is actually Kenai himself. Eventually, Kenai and Koda reach the salmon run, where a large number of bears live as a family, including the leader Tug. Kenai accepts his new surroundings and is comfortable living with the other bears. During a discussion among the bears, Koda tells a story about his mother recently fighting human hunters on a glacier, reminding Kenai of his and his brothers' fight with the bear that led to Sitka's death, making him realize that the entire time, the bear he killed was Koda's mother. 

Horrified of what he has done, Kenai runs away in a fit of guilt, but Koda soon follows him. Downhearted, Kenai confesses the truth to Koda, who runs away, grief-stricken that Kenai was responsible for his mother's death out of avenging Sitka. An apologetic Kenai leaves to reach the mountain. Meanwhile, Rutt and Tuke, having had a falling-out, reconcile in front of Koda, prompting him to forgive Kenai. On the mountain, Kenai is cornered by Denahi, but their battle is interrupted by Koda, who steals Denahi's spear. Kenai sacrifices himself for Koda, out of love, prompting Sitka to appear and turn him back into a human, much to Denahi and Koda's surprise. However, upon realizing that Koda needs him because of his own mistake, Kenai asks Sitka to transform him back into a bear with Denahi's support. Sitka complies, and Kenai is transformed back into a bear. Koda is reunited briefly with the spirit of his mother before she and Sitka return to the spirit world. In the end, Kenai lives with the rest of the bears and gains his title as a man, through being a bear.

Voice cast
 Joaquin Phoenix as Kenai, the younger brother of Sitka and Denahi. After he callously kills a bear, Kenai is turned into one himself to teach him to see through another's eyes, feel through another's heart, and discover the true meaning of brotherhood. John E. Hurst and Byron Howard served as the supervising animators for Kenai in human and bear form respectively.
 Jeremy Suarez as Koda, a cheeky grizzly bear cub who helps Kenai on his journey to where the Lights Touch the Earth. Alex Kupershmidt served as the supervising animator for Koda.
 Rick Moranis and Dave Thomas as Rutt and Tuke, a comedic Canadian moose duo. They are based on the comedy duo characters Bob and Doug, which are portrayed by Moranis and Thomas.
 Jason Raize as Denahi, the middle brother. This was Jason Raize's first and only film role before his death in 2004. Harold Gould provides narration from an older Denahi's point of view. Ruben A. Aquino served as the supervising animator for Denahi.
 D.B. Sweeney as Sitka, the oldest brother.
 Joan Copeland as Tanana, the shaman-woman of Kenai's tribe.
 Michael Clarke Duncan as Tug, a wise old grizzly bear, and the leader of the salmon run bears.
 Greg Proops as Male Lover Bear
 Pauley Perrette as Female Lover Bear
 Estelle Harris as Old Lady Bear
 Darko Cesar as Foreign Croatian Bear
 Paul Christie and Danny Mastrogiorgio as Rams
 Bumper Robinson as Chipmunks
 Angayuqaq Oscar Kawagley as Narrator

Additional vocals by Patrick Pinney, Bob Bergen, Rodger Bumpass, Roger Rose, Debi Derryberry, Randy Crenshaw, Phil Proctor, John Schwab, Bill Farmer, Pamela Adlon, Hope Levy, and Sherry Lynn.

Production

Development
Following the critical and commercial success of The Lion King, Disney chairman and CEO Michael Eisner urged for more animal-centric animated features, and suggested a North American backdrop, taking particular inspiration from an original landscape painting by Albert Bierstadt that he bought. To track the "king" idea, the hero would naturally be a bear, the king of the forest. At the time, the original idea, which was inspired by King Lear, centered around an old blind bear who traveled the forest with his three daughters. In 1997, veteran animator Aaron Blaise came on board the project as director because he "wanted to be attached so that [he] could animate bears", and was soon joined by co-director Robert Walker. Because Blaise desired a more naturalistic story, Blaise and producer Chuck Williams produced a two-page treatment of a father-son story in which the son is transformed into a bear, and in the end, remains a bear. Thomas Schumacher, then-president of Walt Disney Feature Animation, approved the revised story and proclaimed, "This is the idea of the century." Tab Murphy, who had co-written the screenplays for The Hunchback of Notre Dame, Tarzan and Atlantis: The Lost Empire, came on board to write an early draft of the script.

After the project was green-lit, Blaise,  Walker, and the story artists embarked on a research trip in August 1999 to visit Alaska where they traveled on the Valley of Ten Thousand Smokes and Kodiak Island. They also traveled through Denali National Park and the Kenai Fjords National Park, where they visited Exit and Holgate Glacier. A year later, the production team took additional research trips through the Yellowstone National Park, Grand Teton National Park, and the Sequoia National Park. Around 2000, the story evolved into a tale in which the transformed Kenai is taken in by an older bear, Grizz, who was to be voiced by Michael Clarke Duncan. However, Blaise explained that "we were struggling [with the story], trying to get some charm into the film. So we turned Grizz into a cub named Koda", who was voiced by Jeremy Suarez. Because Blaise, Walker, and Williams enjoyed Duncan's vocal performance, Tug, the de facto leader of the bears at the salmon run, was written into the film.

Casting
In March 2001, Joaquin Phoenix confirmed he was cast in the film, exclaiming, "Oh, but forget the Oscar nomination (for Gladiator). The real pinnacle is that I'm playing an animated character in a Disney film. Isn't that the greatest? I play a Native American transformed into a bear. It's called The Bears. Don't call me a leading man. I don't care about that. I'm a leading bear. I am content!" After the filmmakers heard his audition tapes for Finding Nemo, Jeremy Suarez was cast as Koda.

As is typical for animation voice acting, Suarez and Phoenix voiced their roles separately, although they both did a recording session together at least two times. Voicing the moose brothers Rutt and Tuke, Dave Thomas and Rick Moranis performed simultaneously throughout the recording process. Angayuqaq Oscar Kawagley, an associate professor who taught courses on Alaska Native philosophy at the University of Alaska, Fairbanks, claimed he was never given a script, but was instead given "the dialogue that they had written, which was being told by a Native person". For his role as the Inuit Narrator, Kawagley translated the dialogue in written form into Yup'ik and faxed the translation back to the Disney studio. He later recorded his translation at an Anchorage studio while being videotaped for animation reference.

Design and animation 
The film is traditionally animated but includes some CG elements such as "a salmon run and a caribou stampede". Layout artist Armand Serrano, speaking about the drawing process on the film, said that "we had to do a life drawing session with live bear cubs and also outdoor drawing and painting sessions at Fort Wilderness in Florida three times a week for two months [...]".. In 2001, Background supervisor Barry Kooser and his team traveled to Jackson Hole, Wyoming and studied with Western landscape painter Scott Christensen, where they learned to: "simplify objects by getting the spatial dimensions to work first and working in the detail later."

According to Ruben Aquino, supervising animator for the character of Denahi, Denahi was originally meant to be Kenai's father; later this was changed to Kenai's brother. Byron Howard, supervising animator for Kenai in bear form, said that earlier in production a bear named Grizz (who resembles Tug in the film and is voiced by the same actor) was supposed to have the role of Kenai's mentor. Art Director Robh Ruppel stated that the ending of the film originally showed how Kenai and Denahi get together once a year to play when the northern lights are in the sky.

Music

Following the success of the Tarzan soundtrack, Phil Collins was offered the opportunity to compose songs for Brother Bear, as well as let him "co-write the score". However, Collins explained, "Slowly, the bad news started to trickle down that I wouldn't be singing it all. It was a bit of a disappointment, because I [usually] write songs that I sing myself." While Collins composed six songs for the film, he shared vocal performance duties with Tina Turner, who sang the opening song; the Blind Boys Of Alabama and the Bulgarian Women's Choir, who performed the song, "Transformation". Collins's lyrics for the song were first translated into Iñupiaq. The performance was then arranged by score co-composers Collins and Mark Mancina, and vocal arranger Eddie Jobson.

Release
Brother Bear was originally slated for a spring 2004 release, while Home on the Range was scheduled for a 2003 release. However, Disney announced that Brother Bear would be released in fall 2003, while Home on the Range was pushed back for a spring 2004 release. Contrary to speculation, news writer Jim Hill stated the release date switch was not because Home on the Range was suffering from story rewrites, but to promote Brother Bear on the Platinum Edition release of The Lion King. On July 15, 2003, Disney announced that the release date would be moved up by one weekend from its previously scheduled slot of November 7, 2003. However, instead of opening on Halloween, the film would be released on Saturday, November 1, 2003.

On October 20, 2003, Brother Bear premiered at the New Amsterdam Theatre where fellow attendees included New York Governor George Pataki and cast members Michael Clarke Duncan and Estelle Harris. Following the showing of the film, Collins performed "No Way Out" before introducing Tina Turner to the stage where she performed the opening song, "Great Spirits".

Home media
Brother Bear was released on VHS and DVD on March 30, 2004. The DVD release consisted of two separate discs, which were both THX-certified. The first disc contained the widescreen version (1.66:1 aspect ratio) and the second disc featured the original theatrical widescreen version (1.66:1 and 2.35:1 aspect ratio). The DVD also included a documentary on the production of the film, an audio commentary track by Rutt and Tuke with an option for visual mode, an artwork gallery narrated by the artists, three deleted scenes, two games called "Find Your Totem" and "Bone Puzzle", and two music videos with Phil Collins. By January 2005, the film had earned $169 million in home video sales and rentals. In April 2004 alone, 5.51 million DVD copies of the film were sold.

The film was released in a Blu-ray special edition combined with its sequel, Brother Bear 2, on March 12, 2013.

Video game
Disney's Brother Bear games were released in November 2003 for Game Boy Advance, PC and mobile phones.

Reception

Critical reaction
 Metacritic, which assigns a normalized rating out of 100 from top reviews from mainstream critics, calculated a score of 48 based on 28 reviews, indicating "mixed or average reviews". Audiences polled by CinemaScore gave the film an average grade of "A" on an A+ to F scale.

On the syndicated television show At the Movies, film critics Roger Ebert and Richard Roeper both gave the film positive reviews. In his print review for the Chicago Sun-Times, Ebert wrote the film "doesn't have the zowie factor of The Lion King or Finding Nemo, but is sweet rather than exciting. Children and their parents are likely to relate on completely different levels, the adults connecting with the transfer of souls from man to beast, while the kids are excited by the adventure stuff." USA Today film critic Claudia Puig gave the film three out of four stars praising the film for its "message of tolerance and respect for nature rings loud and clear. And family audiences are treated to a vibrantly hued movie with appealing characters." Kirk Honeycutt of The Hollywood Reporter called the film "a playful movie that celebrates nature and the spirit world with striking imagery and a smooth blend of drama and comedy." 

Writing for Variety, Todd McCarthy summarized that "Brother Bear is a very mild animated entry from Disney with a distinctly recycled feel [because] the film's characters and narrative simply fail to engage strong interest, and tale is probably too resolutely serious to enchant small fry in the way the better Disney titles always have." Kenneth Turan, reviewing for the Los Angeles Times, complimented "the richness and fluidity of its visuals" and the "satisfying ending", but derided that "Brother Bear has an appeal that can't be denied. Too often, however, this film's lack of a fresh dramatic approach and not its technique makes it difficult to embrace as much as we'd like to". Stephen Holden of The New York Times felt the film was too similar to The Lion King. He later wrote: "This opulent movie, with gorgeous rainbow animation, is heavy on message but light on humor." 

Many critics and audiences also noted the use of the film's aspect ratio as a storytelling device. The film begins at a standard widescreen aspect ratio of 1.75:1 (similar to the 1.85:1 ratio common in U.S. cinema or the 1.78:1 ratio of HDTV), while Kenai is a human; in addition, the film's art direction and color scheme are grounded in realism. After Kenai transforms into a bear twenty-four minutes into the picture, the film itself transforms as well: to an anamorphic aspect ratio of 2.35:1 and towards brighter, more fanciful colors and slightly more caricatured art direction. Brother Bear was the first feature since The Horse Whisperer to do a widescreen shift. It was the only animated film to feature this technique, until The Simpsons Movie and Enchanted in 2007.

Box office
In its limited release, Brother Bear played only in two selected theaters in Los Angeles, California and New York City, grossing $291,940 for a per-screen average of $145,970. The wide release followed on November 1, 2003 expanding to 3,030 theater venues. The film opened second behind Scary Movie 3 grossing $18.5 million at the box office. On its second wide weekend, the film continued its strong showing grossing $18.6 million against new competing films such as Elf and The Matrix Revolutions, collecting $44.1 million in three weeks. The film grossed $85.3 million in the United States and Canada, and $165.1 million in international territories, bringing its worldwide total to $250.4 million.

Awards and nominations

Legacy
The song "Welcome" written by Phil Collins was later used as the theme song for Walt Disney's Parade of Dreams during the Happiest Homecoming on Earth, celebrating the 50th anniversary of Disneyland. For the parade, the song had slightly changed lyrics and was performed by an ensemble.

Cancelled television spin-off and sequel
Disney Television Animation was set to produce a television series titled Brother Bear: The Series for Disney Channel. The Simpsons veteran Pete Michels was to helm the series and was allowed to watch a copy of the film so that he could construct a pilot. The series would have taken place directly after the events of the film and would have seen Kenai and Koda adopt other orphaned animals into their family. Jeremy Suarez, Rick Moranis and Dave Thomas were to reprise their respective roles while Will Friedle would have replaced Joaquin Phoenix as Kenai. While the pilot tested well, it was not picked up as Disney Channel executives felt that adapting the film as a series was "counterproductive" to their goal of trying to reach a tween audience, combined with the fact that the movie performed below expectations.

A direct-to-video sequel called Brother Bear 2 was released on August 29, 2006. It focuses on the continued adventures of bear brothers Kenai and Koda. While the first film dealt with Kenai's relationship with Koda, this one focuses more on his bond with a young human of his past, Nita.

See also

List of Disney theatrical animated features

References

External links 

 
 
 
 
 
 
 

Brother Bear
2003 animated films
2003 films
2003 directorial debut films
2000s American animated films
2000s musical comedy-drama films
2000s musical fantasy films
2000s English-language films
Films about Inuit in Canada
American children's animated comedy films
American children's animated drama films
American children's animated fantasy films
American comedy-drama films
American children's animated musical films
American coming-of-age films
American musical fantasy films
Animated buddy films
American buddy comedy-drama films
American musical drama films
Animated coming-of-age films
Animated films about animals
Animated drama films
Animated films set in prehistory
Children's comedy-drama films
Films about animal rights
Animated films about bears
Films about shapeshifting
Films directed by Aaron Blaise
Films directed by Robert Walker (animator)
Films set in Alaska
Inuktitut-language films
Musicals by Phil Collins
Walt Disney Animation Studios films
Walt Disney Pictures animated films
Films about brothers
2000s buddy comedy-drama films
2000s children's animated films
Inuit films
2003 comedy films
2003 drama films
Films with screenplays by Tab Murphy
Animated films about brothers
Films scored by Mark Mancina